Rich Costey is an American record producer, mixer and engineer, 
who works in several musical genres, including hip-hop, rock, pop, indie, and electronica. As a producer, Costey's credits include Sigur Rós, Frank Turner, Muse, Foster the People, Swirlies, Santigold and Biffy Clyro. He has occasionally worked as a DJ and musician on these albums as well. He has been managed by René Symonds at Tap Mgmt since 2022

Biography
At age 16, Costey became a disc jockey on a local radio station before going on to attend the Berklee College of Music in Boston. While working at Q Division Studios as an assistant, he learned about classic recording techniques and started working with producer Jon Brion whom he credits as an important influence and future collaborator. His first steady gig as a producer was with Boston indie band Swirlies whose repertoire expanded from American shoegaze rock into dance music and electronica under Costey's tutelage. The albums and EPs Costey made with Swirlies helped establish him as a go-to producer for indie bands and brought him to work with Sebadoh, Madder Rose, and Pavement during the 1990s.

After college Costey moved to New York City, and in 1995 started working at Philip Glass's Looking Glass studio. Within six months Costey was the facility's head engineer. At the same time, he worked with bands such as Bowery Electric and the Lilys at Michael Deming's Studio 45 in Hartford, Connecticut.

After he relocated to Los Angeles, Costey and Brion collaborated on the Fiona Apple track Brion was producing for the soundtrack to Pleasantville as well as contributing a remix of Cheap Trick's "Surrender" for the Small Soldiers soundtrack.  He later engineered and mixed Fiona Apple's album When the Pawn.... His work on the Fiona album attracted the attention of producer Rick Rubin who loved the sound of When The Pawn... and hired Costey to mix Audioslave's 2002 self-titled debut and Rage Against the Machine's 2003 live album, Live at the Grand Olympic Auditorium.

In 2003, Muse recruited Costey to produce their breakthrough third LP, Absolution. His most recent credits include Foster the People, Birdy, Young the Giant, Chvrches, Phantogram and Kimbra. He also produced Death Cab for Cutie's eighth studio album, Kintsugi, which was released on March 31, 2015.

Awards
In 2008, the Foo Fighters album Echoes, Silence, Patience & Grace, which Costey mixed, won the award for Best Rock Album at the 50th Annual Grammy Awards. The album also won Best International Album at the 2008 Brit Awards.

Discography

Producing, engineering, mixing

References

External links
Rich Costey at Allmusic

Record producers from California
American audio engineers
Mixing engineers
Living people
Lilys members
Year of birth missing (living people)